Pinet is a commune in the Hérault department in the Occitanie region in southern France.

Population

Economy
AOP Picpoul de Pinet is the only white wine appellation in the Languedoc. Vineyards are situated on the low hills surrounding the Etang de Thau, and include six different villages. The wine is named Picpoul de Pinet, but the grape variety is Piquepoul blanc.

See also
Communes of the Hérault department

References

Communes of Hérault